The Interpretation Act (Northern Ireland) 1954 (c 33) (NI) is an Act of the Parliament of Northern Ireland. It replaces the Interpretation Act 1889 for Northern Ireland (see s 48).

See also
Interpretation Act

References

External links
The Interpretation Act (Northern Ireland) 1954, as amended, from the National Archives.

Acts of the Parliament of Northern Ireland 1954